The UK R&B Albums Chart is a weekly chart, first introduced in October 1994, that ranks the 40 biggest-selling albums that are classified in the R&B genre in the United Kingdom. The chart is compiled by the Official Charts Company, and is based on sales of CDs, downloads, vinyl and other formats over the previous seven days.

The following are the number-one albums of 2022

Number-one albums

Notes
  - The album was simultaneously number-one on the UK Albums Chart. 
  - The artist was simultaneously number-one on the R&B Singles Chart.

See also

 List of UK Albums Chart number ones of the 2020s
 List of UK R&B Singles Chart number ones of 2022

References

External links
R&B Albums Top 40 at the Official Charts Company
UK Top 40 RnB Albums at BBC Radio 1

2022 in British music
United Kingdom RandB Albums
2022